Mohammad Reza Tabasi (Persian: محمد رضا طبسی) Shia Scientist in the fourteenth century AH. Sheikh Mohammad Reza Najafi Tabasi child of Abbas ibn Ali ibn al-Hasan, known as Moraveji is Tabasi. In Sha'ban AH 1317 (1989) was born in Mashhad. Ayatollah Moraveji Tabasi opponents of the Pahlavi regime. "

Education 
He completed his studies in Mashhad, Qom and Najaf were sought and was awarded the degree of Ijtihad. Muhammad Baqir Rizvi Madras, Mirza Javad Maleki Tabrizi, Sheikh Ali Shah Abadi and Abdul-Karim Ha'eri Yazdi, Abu al-Hasan Isfahani, Muhammad Hosein NĀʾĪNĪ and Sheikh Ziauddin Iraqi were his professors."

Students 
Tabasi disciple of Sheikh Morteza Haeri Yazdi (son of Sheikh Abdul-Karim Ha'eri Yazdi), Ali Naghi Monzavi, Muhammad Sodooqi, Ali Davani, and others.

Death 
Moraveji Tabasi on the night of 25 Rabi al-Awal 1405 AH 28 January 1984 at the age of 88 died and was buried in Qom."

References 

Iranian Shia scholars of Islam
Iranian writers
Religious writers